Konstantin Gertig (born 2 February 2004) is a German professional footballer who plays as a defender for 2. Liga club Liefering.

Club career
Gertig left Bayern Munich to join former club Red Bull Salzburg in 2021.

Career statistics

References

2004 births
Living people
German footballers
Association football defenders
2. Liga (Austria) players
FC Red Bull Salzburg players
FC Bayern Munich footballers
FC Liefering players
German expatriate footballers
German expatriate sportspeople in Austria
Expatriate footballers in Austria
21st-century German people